The 2014 All-Big Ten Conference football team consists of American football players chosen as All-Big Ten Conference players for the 2014 Big Ten Conference football season.  The conference recognizes two official All-Big Ten selectors: (1) the Big Ten conference coaches selected separate offensive and defensive units and named first- and second-team players (the "Coaches" team); and (2) a panel of sports writers and broadcasters covering the Big Ten also selected offensive and defensive units and named first- and second-team players (the "Media" team).

Michigan State led all other teams with five first-team selections, including wide receiver Tony Lippett and defensive back Shilique Calhoun.  Conference and national champion Ohio State followed with four first-team selections, including quarterback J. T. Barrett and Joey Bosa.

There were only two unanimous selections, both of whom were All-Americans, consensus All-American defensive lineman Joey Bosa and unanimous All-American running back Melvin Gordon.

Offensive selections

Quarterbacks
 J. T. Barrett, Ohio State (Coaches-1; Media-1)
 Connor Cook, Michigan State (Coaches-2; Media-2)

Running backs
 Tevin Coleman, Indiana (Coaches-1; Media-1)
 MELVIN GORDON, Wisconsin (Coaches-1; Media-1)
 Ameer Abdullah, Nebraska (Coaches-2; Media-2)
 David Cobb, Minnesota (Coaches-2; Media-2)

Wide receivers
 Tony Lippett, Michigan State (Coaches-1; Media-1)
 Kenny Bell, Nebraska (Coaches-1)
 Leonte Carroo, Rutgers (Media-1)
 Stefon Diggs, Maryland (Coaches-2)
 Devin Funchess, Michigan (Coaches-2)
 Mike Dudek, Illinois (Media-2)
 DaeSean Hamilton, Penn State (Media-2)

Centers
 Jack Allen, Michigan State (Coaches-1; Media-1)
 Austin Blythe, Iowa (Coaches-2)
 Dan Voltz, Wisconsin (Media-2)

Guards
 Kyle Costigan, Wisconsin (Coaches-1; Media-1)
 Pat Elflein, Ohio State (Coaches-1; Media-2)
 Zac Epping, Minnesota (Coaches-2; Media-1)
 Travis Jackson, Michigan State (Coaches-2; Media-2)

Tackles
 Brandon Scherff, Iowa (Coaches-1; Media-1)
 Rob Havenstein, Wisconsin (Coaches-1; Media-1)
 Jack Conklin, Michigan State (Coaches-2; Media-2)
 Taylor Decker, Ohio State (Coaches-2; Media-2)

Tight ends
 Maxx Williams, Minnesota (Coaches-1; Media-1)
 Jeff Heuerman, Ohio State (Coaches-2; Media-2)

Defensive selections

Defensive linemen
 JOEY BOSA, Ohio State (Coaches-1; Media-1) 
 Shilique Calhoun, Michigan State (Coaches-1; Media-1) 
 Randy Gregory, Nebraska (Coaches-1; Media-1) 
 Anthony Zettel, Penn State (Coaches-1; Media-1)
 Carl Davis, Iowa (Coaches-2; Media-2)
 Michael Bennett, Ohio State (Coaches-2; Media-2)
 Louis Trinca-Pasat, Iowa (Coaches-2)
 Maliek Collins, Nebraska (Coaches-2)
 Drew Ott, Iowa (Media-2)
 Andre Monroe, Maryland (Media-2)

Linebackers
 Jake Ryan, Michigan (Coaches-1; Media-1)
 Mike Hull, Penn State (Coaches-1; Media-1)
 Derek Landisch, Wisconsin (Coaches-1; Media-2)
 Damien Wilson, Minnesota (Coaches-2; Media-1)
 Quinton Alston, Iowa (Coaches-2)
 Taiwan Jones, Michigan State (Coaches-2)
 Joshua Perry, Ohio State (Media-2)
 Vince Biegel, Wisconsin (Media-2)

Defensive backs
 William Likely, Maryland (Coaches-1; Media-1) 
 Kurtis Drummond, Michigan State (Coaches-1; Media-1)
 Trae Waynes, Michigan State (Coaches-1; Media-1)
 Doran Grant, Ohio State  (Coaches-1; Media-2)
 Briean Boddy-Calhoun, Minnesota (Coaches-2; Media-1)
 Michael Caputo, Wisconsin (Coaches-2; Media-2)
 Ibraheim Campbell, Northwestern (Coaches-2)
 Eric Murray, Minnesota (Coaches-2)
 Frankie Williams, Purdue (Coaches-2)
 Darius Hillary, Wisconsin (Coaches-2)
 Nate Gerry, Nebraska (Media-2)
 Nick Van Hoose, Northwestern (Media-2)

Special teams

Kickers
 Brad Craddock, Maryland (Coaches-1; Media-1)
 Sam Ficken, Penn State (Coaches-2; Media-2)

Punters
 Peter Mortell, Minnesota (Coaches-1; Media-1)
 Justin DuVernois, Illinois (Coaches-2; Media-2)

Key
CAPS = Unanimous first-team selection by both the coaches and media

Bold = Consensus first-team selection by both the coaches and media

Coaches = Selected by the Big Ten Conference coaches

Media = Selected by the conference media

See also
 2014 College Football All-America Team

References

All-Big Ten Conference
All-Big Ten Conference football teams